Lauca is a Biosphere Reserve, located in northern Chile, in Arica y Parinacota Region. The reserve comprises three protected areas: Lauca National Park, Las Vicuñas National Reserve and Salar de Surire Natural Monument. This zone was declared a Biosphere Reserve by UNESCO in 1981.

See also

 List of environment topics
 World Network of Biosphere Reserves

References and external links
 Lauca Biosphere Reserve

Biosphere reserves of Chile
Geography of Arica y Parinacota Region